Jan Mulder (born 3 October 1943 in Diever) is a Dutch politician who served as a Member of the European Parliament (MEP) from 1994 until 2004 and from 2010 until 2014. He is a member of the People's Party for Freedom and Democracy (VVD),  a member party of the Alliance of Liberals and Democrats for Europe.

Political career
Mulder served as vice-chair of the European Parliament's Committee on Budgets and its Committee on Budgetary Control. In 2007 he was elected one of the six quaestors of the European Parliament.

He was a substitute for the Committee on Agriculture and Rural Development and the Committee on Fisheries. During the 2009 European Parliament elections, he was not re-elected but in May 2010 he replaced Jeanine Hennis-Plasschaert who was elected in the Dutch parliament.

Mulder is in favour of the European cause and supported the Spinelli Group manifesto.

Other activities
 European Anti-Fraud Office (OLAF), Chairman of the Supervisory Committee

Education
 1970: Agricultural engineer

Career timeline
 1970–1975: Assistant FAO expert and subsequently FAO expert in Kenya
 1975–1976: Official of the Ministry of Foreign Affairs, The Hague
 1976–1994: Official of the European Commission, Brussels
 1977–1988: Chairman of the VVD Brussels section
 1994–2009, 2010–2014: Member of the European Parliament

See also
2004 European Parliament election in the Netherlands

References

External links
 
 
 

1943 births
Living people
People from Westerveld
Dutch agronomists
Food and Agriculture Organization officials
Wageningen University and Research alumni
People's Party for Freedom and Democracy MEPs
MEPs for the Netherlands 1994–1999
MEPs for the Netherlands 1999–2004
MEPs for the Netherlands 2004–2009
MEPs for the Netherlands 2009–2014
Dutch officials of the United Nations